Phryneta aurocincta is a species of beetle in the family Cerambycidae. It was described by Félix Édouard Guérin-Méneville in 1832, originally under the genus Lamia. It has a wide distribution throughout Africa.

Varieties
 Phryneta aurocincta var. cingulata Aurivillius, 1924
 Phryneta aurocincta var. favareli Achard, 1913

References

Phrynetini
Beetles described in 1832